Sankarabharanam may refer to:

 Sankarabharanam (1980 film), an Indian Telugu-language musical drama film
 Sankarabharanam (2015 film), an Indian Telugu-language crime comedy film
 Sankarabharanam (raga), a rāga in Carnatic music